Roger of Salerno (or Roger of the Principate) (died June 28, 1119) was regent of the Principality of Antioch from 1112 to 1119.
He was the son of Richard of the Principate and the 2nd cousin of Tancred, Prince of Galilee, both participants on the First Crusade. He became regent of Antioch when Tancred died in 1112; the actual prince, Bohemund II, was still a child. Like Tancred, Roger was almost constantly at war with the nearby Muslim states such as Aleppo. In 1114 there was an earthquake that destroyed many of the fortifications of the principality, and Roger took great care to rebuild them, especially those near the frontier.

Roger defeated Bursuq ibn Bursuq in 1115 at the Battle of Tell Danith. With Joscelin I of Edessa, Roger put enough military pressure on Aleppo that the city allied with Ortoqid emir Ilghazi in 1118. Ilghazi invaded the Principality in 1119, and despite the urging of the Patriarch, Roger did not wait for reinforcements from Jerusalem or Tripoli. At the ensuing Battle of Ager Sanguinis he had 700 knights and 3000 foot soldiers, including 500 Armenian cavalry, but nearly all were killed, including Roger himself. Ilghazi's forces scattered to plunder the surrounding land and did not attack Antioch itself. Baldwin II of Jerusalem came north to take over the regency of the principality.

He married Cecilia of Le Bourcq, daughter of Hugh I, Count of Rethel and sister of Baldwin II. No children of this union are recorded. Roger's reign was chronicled by his chancellor Walter.

Roger is also known in numismatic history for the unique series of coins, minted during his reign. Despite ruling for less than seven years, he had two different types of coin, minted in his name at Antioch. The first type bore the image of the Mother of God Orans, standing full-height. The second type bore the image of the Miracle of Saint George and the Dragon. It is quite possible that it was minted after Roger's great victory at the Battle of Tell Danith. Prince Roger was in fact the first ruler in the Christian world to depict the Miracle of Saint George and the Dragon on his coinage.

References

Sources

1119 deaths
Christians of the Crusades
Military personnel killed in action
Italo-Normans
Norman warriors
Year of birth unknown
Regents of Antioch